Richard "Rick" Worthy (born March 12, 1967) is an American actor. He is best known for appearing in a variety of science fiction and fantasy television shows. He is perhaps best known for his recurring role as Simon O'Neill cylon model number four in the reimagined Battlestar Galactica.

He had a recurring role on The Man in the High Castle and was a series regular on The Magicians. He also appeared as six different characters across three Star Trek spin-off series and one feature film.

Early life and education
Worthy was born in Detroit, Michigan; his father worked in the automotive industry. Worthy studied Tae Kwon Do at a young age. He graduated from Southfield Senior High School in 1985 and from the University of Michigan School of Music, Theatre & Dance in 1990.

Career
Worthy became a stage actor in Detroit, then moving to Chicago to develop his theatrical skills. Later, he moved to Los Angeles, California with the goal of acting in film and television.

His first big break came as an orderly in While You Were Sleeping in 1995.

In the same year he played Rickey Latrell, a basketball player accused of murder, on the television show Murder One in 1996.

He played Nathan Jackson on the 1998–99 TV show The Magnificent Seven.

He has had several roles within the Star Trek franchise. He has played several aliens, and one human, in Star Trek: Deep Space Nine, Star Trek: Voyager and Star Trek: Enterprise. He also had a supporting role in the 1998 film Star Trek: Insurrection.

He guest-starred in "The Warrior", a 2001 episode of Stargate SG-1, where he made use of his Tae Kwon Do and stunt fighting skills as the Goa'uld Imhotep.

He appeared on the 2003–09 re-imagined version of Battlestar Galactica as Cylon model number Four, often referred to as "Simon".

He worked on a short-lived 2005 private-eye drama on ABC, Eyes.

He had a large role on the 2006 ABC Family miniseries Fallen.

Worthy appeared in four episodes of Heroes in 2009, playing "Mike", Matt Parkman's  partner, an experienced and capable Los Angeles cop. He also had a part in the TV series Supernatural, playing the unnamed Alpha Vampire in two episodes of Season 6, one episode of season 7 and one episode of season 12.

Worthy appeared on NCIS in 2012 as Navy Captain Logan Doyle.

Worthy was featured in the 2012 documentary That Guy... Who Was in That Thing, about character actors. During the documentary Worthy is brought to tears while describing his devotion to acting nearly leading to him ending up homeless. He credits a small recurring role on an American soap opera show, during which he rode his bicycle to the studio due to having sold off his car to pay his rent, as saving his acting career.

Filmography

References

External links

 
 
 Rick Worthy on Instagram

1967 births
Living people
Male actors from Detroit
University of Michigan School of Music, Theatre & Dance alumni
African-American male actors
21st-century African-American people
20th-century African-American people